Roger Rasmussen, better known by the stage name Nattefrost, is a Norwegian musician, best known for being the vocalist and a founding member of black metal band Carpathian Forest. He also fronts the side projects World Destroyer and Kreft, and since 2003 also has a solo project of his own.

Biography
Rasmussen was born in Sandnes, Rogaland County, Norway. His first musical ventures were with the black metal band The Childmolesters, which he founded in 1990 alongside his future Carpathian Forest bandmate Johnny "Nordavind" Krøvel. The band was very short-lived, ending in the same year; from its demise arose Enthrone, which changed its name to Carpathian Forest in 1992. During Carpathian Forest's first years of existence, Nattefrost used the pseudonym Lord Nosferatu; he would not be known as "Nattefrost" (Norwegian for "Night frost") until 1995, when the band released its first EP, Through Chasm, Caves and Titan Woods.

In 2000 Nattefrost formed his first side project, World Destroyer, alongside Eivind Kulde and his Carpathian Forest bandmate Daniel Vrangsinn. The band released a demo album, Diabolical Quest, in 2004; it is their only release so far. He would form the duo Kreft in 2011 alongside Patolog Falk, releasing in the same year the EP Lommemannen.

In 2003 Nattefrost announced that he would begin a solo project, and in the following year he released his first album, Blood & Vomit. His second album, Terrorist (Nekronaut, Part I), came out in the following year and counted with guest appearances by numerous musicians, such as Carl-Michael Eide, Sanrabb of Gehenna and Hoest of Taake. He also released a live EP in 2006, entitled Drunk and Pisseskev at Ringnes 2004, which was recorded during his first show, in Ringnes, and a compilation of rarities, Hell Noise and Live Terrorism, came out in 2008.

Nattefrost's latest release was the 2009 split album Engangsgrill, with Darkthrone's Fenriz's doom metal side project Fenriz's Red Planet.

In 2016 he collaborated with Urgehal, providing vocals and lyrics for the song "Endetid", off their seventh album Aeons in Sodom. He previously collaborated with Green Carnation (on Light of Day, Day of Darkness), Taake (on Hordalands doedskvad) and Aura Noir (on The Merciless).

Discography

With Carpathian Forest
 For a more comprehensive list, see Carpathian Forest#Discography
 1998: Black Shining Leather
 2000: Strange Old Brew
 2001: Morbid Fascination of Death
 2003: Defending the Throne of Evil
 2006: Fuck You All!!!! Caput tuum in ano est

Solo
 2004: Blood & Vomit
 2005: Terrorist (Nekronaut, Part I)
 2006: Drunk and Pisseskev at Ringnes 2004 (EP)
 2008: Hell Noise and Live Terrorism (compilation)
 2009: Engangsgrill (split with Fenriz' Red Planet)

With World Destroyer
 2004: Diabolical Quest (demo)

With Kreft
 2011: Lommemannen (EP)

As a session member
Green Carnation
 2001: Light of Day, Day of Darkness (harsh vocals)

Aura Noir
 2004: The Merciless (additional vocals in "Funeral Thrash")

Taake
 2005: Hordalands doedskvad (additional vocals in "Hordalands doedskvad I")

Urgehal
 2016: Aeons in Sodom (vocals and lyrics for "Endetid")

References

External links
 Nattefrost at Myspace

Date of birth missing (living people)
Black metal singers
Norwegian heavy metal bass guitarists
Norwegian male bass guitarists
Norwegian heavy metal singers
Norwegian black metal musicians
Norwegian heavy metal drummers
Male drummers
Norwegian male singers
Norwegian multi-instrumentalists
Norwegian rock bass guitarists
Norwegian rock singers
Norwegian songwriters
Musicians from Sandnes
Black metal guitarists
Season of Mist artists
Carpathian Forest members
Living people
Year of birth missing (living people)